Changing Seasons is a 2012 jazz album by the Phil Dwyer Orchestra featuring violinist Mark Fewer. It won the Juno Award for Contemporary Jazz Album of the Year in 2012.

References

2012 albums
Phil Dwyer (musician) albums
Juno Award for Contemporary Jazz Album of the Year albums